The Cat and the Moon is a 2019 American coming-of-age drama film written and directed by Alex Wolff, who stars alongside Mike Epps, Skyler Gisondo, Tommy Nelson, Patricia Pinto, and Stefania LaVie Owen. The film had its world premiere at the San Antonio Film Festival on July 31, 2019. It was released by FilmRise on October 25, 2019, in select theaters in New York City and Los Angeles, as well as through digital and on-demand services.

Plot
During his mother's rehabilitation time, Nick moved to New York to stay with whom we later learn is Cal, an old musician friend of his father's. On his way to his school, Nick considers attempting suicide by jumping in front of an oncoming train but at last minute, is spooked back. Upon arriving at school, he meets a girl, whom we later learn is named Eliza. After his first class, Nick is in the bathroom attempting to get high. Two guys walk in whom befriend him named Shaemus and Russell. He is then invited by them to a party. He is then introduced to Skylar and Eliza again, after it is revealed that Eliza and Sheamus are dating. At the party, Eliza and Nick bond over childhood memories and the piano. Meanwhile, Shaemus upstairs on the roof of the party, receives a handjob from a random girl. The next day, Seamus hinted at Nick at a fast-food vendor that he cheated on Eliza and told Nick not to tell her. On a Friday night out, Russel bought illegal drugs from a black man standing in the street but called the man the n-word. The man then threatened Russell with a gun before they left. On that same Friday's party, Nick and his friends got intoxicated on the drugs that Russel bought. Shaemus again cheats on Eliza as he gives another girl oral in the bathroom, which Nick walks in on. A drunk Lola takes Nick to the bedroom, makes out with Nick but is interrupted by a group of boys, who taunted Nick into fighting. Nick and his friends brought Lola home, and Eliza had sex with Nick. Cal told Nick the next day that Nick's mother is getting better and he can return soon but then tells Nick about staying in New York. On a bus ride, Nick is overwhelmed with emotion seeing Seamus with Eliza, and attempted suicide again, but returned home vomiting and had an emotional breakdown with Cal. The next day at school, Seamus beat Nick for he had had sex with Eliza. Later that day, Eliza came to talk to Nick and the two parted ways. At the farewell party, Seamus and Nick made peace, and Nick gave Seamus a book on French naughty words. Nick looked at Eliza for the final time.

Cast
 Alex Wolff as Nick
 Mike Epps as Cal
 Skyler Gisondo as Seamus
 Stefania LaVie Owen as Eliza
 Tommy Nelson as Russell
 Giullian Yao Gioiello as Skyler
 Mischa Barton as Jessica Petersen
 Patricia Pinto as Self
 Paula Rossman as Christine

Reception
On Metacritic the film has a score of 63 based on reviews from 5 critics, indicating "generally favorable reviews."

Dennis Harvey of Variety wrote: "While the gist here is a familiar one of coming-of-age seriocomedy, Wolff avoids predictable beats, letting significant insights emerge almost incidentally rather than milking them for melodramatic effect."

References

External links
 

2019 films
2010s coming-of-age drama films
2019 independent films
American coming-of-age drama films
American independent films
Films set in New York City
2019 drama films
2010s English-language films
2010s American films